María Belén Alderete Gayoso (born 14 June 1994) is a Paraguayan model and beauty pageant titleholder who won the title of Miss Universo Paraguay 2018 at Reinas de Belleza del Paraguay 2018. She represented Paraguay at Miss Universe 2018 pageant in Thailand, and represented Paraguay at Reina Hispanoamericana 2018, held in Santa Cruz, Bolivia, where she finished as the second runner-up.

Pageantry

Reinas de Belleza del Paraguay 2018 
Alderete representing Cordillera was crowned Miss Universo Paraguay at the Reinas de Belleza del Paraguay 2018 pageant on August 24, 2018, at the Resort Yacht y Golf Club Paraguayo. She was crowned by outgoing titleholder Ariela Machado, Miss Universo Paraguay 2017.

Reina Hispanoamericana 2018 
After Ana Livieres resigned as Reina Hispanoamericana Paraguay 2018, Alderete was assigned by Promociones Gloria to represent Paraguay at Reina Hispanoamericana 2018 pageant in Bolivia where she finished as the 2nd Runner-up.

Miss Universe 2018 
As Miss Universo Paraguay, Alderete would represent Paraguay at Miss Universe 2018 pageant in Thailand, but unfortunately she didn't place among the Top 20.

References

External links
Official Nuestra Belleza Paraguay website

Living people
Miss Universe 2018 contestants
1994 births
Paraguayan beauty pageant winners
Paraguayan female models
People from Caacupé